Anne Valentina Berthelsen (born 16 September 1994 in Hørsholm) is a Danish politician, who is a member of the Folketing for the Socialist People's Party. She was elected into the Folketing in the 2019 Danish general election.

Political career
Berthelsen first ran for parliament in the 2019 election, where she received 1,304 votes. This was enough for her to gain one of the Socialist People's Party's levelling seats.

External links 
 Biography on the website of the Danish Parliament (Folketinget)

References 

Living people
1994 births
People from Hørsholm Municipality
21st-century Danish women politicians
Women members of the Folketing
Socialist People's Party (Denmark) politicians
Members of the Folketing 2019–2022
Members of the Folketing 2022–2026